Driewegen is a hamlet in the Dutch province of Zeeland. It is a part of the municipality of Terneuzen.

The hamlet was first mentioned between 1838 and 1857 as Driewegen, and means "(intersection of) three roads". Driewegen has place name signs.

Notable inhabitants 
 Wim Kolijn (1944-2015), politician

References

Populated places in Zeeland
Terneuzen